Amīr Krōṛ Sūrī, also known as Jahan Pahlawan, is a legendary character in Afghan national history and is claimed to have become the King of Mandesh in Ghor. Amir Kror Suri is considered to be the first poet of Pashto language. He is not to be confused with Amir Suri, the buddhist king of Ghor in the 9th-10th century.

Description in Pata Khazana
According to Pata Khazana, Amir Kror Sori was son of a man named Amir Polad Suri who was the governor of Ghor. Allegedly, he lived in the time of Abu Muslim Khorasani in the 8th century, and became the first poet of Pashto language.

According to legend, Amir Kror was a renowned fighter and challenged several people at a time, despite a small body he was a large soul. Because of his bravery and strength, he is given the Pashto title Kror, meaning "hard" and "strong". It is claimed that he had conquered the fortresses of Ghor, Balishtan, Kheisar, Tamran and Barkoshak and assisted the Caliphate of Islam, but there are no historical documents or proofs for this claim,

Death and succession
According to legend, Amir Kror Suri died in 154 H./771 A.D. in the Battle of Poshanj (which is a village in ancient city of Herat) and was succeeded by his son, Amir Naser, who took control of the territories of Ghor, Sur, Bost and Zamindawar.

See also
Amir Suri, a Buddhist Ghurid king in the 9th and 10th century who was defeated in war with the Saffarid ruler Ya'qub ibn al-Layth al-Saffar
Qais Abdur Rashid, whose three legendary sons are said to have founded the modern Pashtun nation
Sur (Pashtun tribe)

Further reading
 Afghanistan by Manohar Singh Batra. PP. 9–14 
 Pata Khazana: Abdul Hai Habibi
 Amir Kror and his Ancestry: Abdul Hai Habibi –

Footnotes

External links
 Online version of Pata Khazana Translated by Khushal Habibi

Year of birth unknown
771 deaths
Pashto-language poets
Pashtun people